The James River is a river in Virginia that begins in the Appalachian Mountains and flows  to the Chesapeake Bay. The river length extends to  if the Jackson River is included, the longer of its two headwaters. It is the longest river in Virginia. Jamestown and Williamsburg, Virginia's first colonial capitals, and Richmond, Virginia's current capital, lie on the James River.

History

The Native Americans who populated the area east of the Fall Line in the late 16th and early 17th centuries called the James River the Powhatan River, named for the Powhatans who occupied the area.

The navigable portion of the river was the major highway of colonial Virginia during its first 15 years, facilitating supply ships delivering supplies and more emigrants from England. However, for the first five years, despite hopes of discovering gold ores, these ships sent little of monetary value back to the sponsors. In 1612, businessman John Rolfe successfully cultivated a non-native strain of tobacco which proved popular in England. Soon, the river became the primary means of exporting the large hogsheads of this cash crop from an ever-growing number of plantations with wharfs along its banks. This development made the proprietary efforts of the Virginia Company of London successful financially, spurring even more development, investments and immigration. Below the falls at Richmond, many James River plantations had their own wharves, and additional ports and/or early railheads were located at Warwick, Bermuda Hundred, City Point, Claremont, Scotland, and Smithfield, and, during the 17th century, the capital of the colony at Jamestown.

Navigation of the James River played an important role in early Virginia commerce and in the settlement of the interior, although growth of the colony was primarily in the Tidewater region during the first 75 years. The upper reaches of the river above the head of navigation at the fall line were explored by  fur-trading parties sent out by Abraham Wood during the late 17th century.

Although ocean-going ships were unable to navigate beyond present-day Richmond, portage of products and navigation with smaller craft to transport crops other than tobacco was feasible. Produce from the Piedmont and Great Valley regions descended the river to seaports at Richmond and Manchester through such port towns as Lynchburg, Scottsville,  Columbia and Buchanan.

James River and Kanawha Canal
The James River was considered a route for transport of produce from the Ohio Valley. The James River and Kanawha Canal was built for this purpose, to provide a navigable portion of the Kanawha River, a tributary of the Ohio River. For the most mountainous section between the two points, the James River and Kanawha Turnpike was built to provide a portage link for wagons and stagecoaches. However, before the canal could be fully completed, in the mid-19th century, railroads emerged as a more practical technology and eclipsed canals for economical transportation. The Chesapeake and Ohio Railway (C&O) was completed between Richmond and the Ohio River at the new city of Huntington, West Virginia by 1873, dooming the canal's economic prospects. In the late-19th century, the Richmond and Alleghany Railroad was laid along the eastern portion of the canal's towpath, and became part of the C&O within 10 years. In modern times, this rail line is used primarily in transporting West Virginia coal to export coal piers at Newport News.

Kepone contamination  
During the 1960s and 1970s, mishandling and dumping of the insecticide Kepone resulted in the contamination of large stretches of the James River Estuary downstream of the Allied Signal Company and LifeSciences Product Company plants in Hopewell, Virginia. Due to the pollution, many businesses and restaurants along the river suffered economic losses. In 1975 Virginia Governor Mills Godwin Jr. shut down the James River to fishing for 100 miles, from  Richmond to the Chesapeake Bay. This ban remained in effect for 13 years, until efforts to clean up the river began to show results. A decade of accumulated silt, lying above the contaminated riverbed, helped to reduce levels of the chemical.

Watershed and course
The James River drains a catchment comprising . The watershed includes about 4% open water and an area with a population of 2.5 million people (2000). The James River forms near Iron Gate on the border between Alleghany and Botetourt counties, from the confluence of the Cowpasture and Jackson rivers in the Appalachian Mountains. It flows into the Chesapeake Bay at Hampton Roads. Tidal waters extend west to Richmond at the river's fall line (the head of navigation). Larger tributaries draining to the tidal portion include the Appomattox River, Chickahominy River, Warwick River, Pagan River, and the Nansemond River.

At its mouth near Newport News Point, the Elizabeth River and the Nansemond River join the James River to form the harbor area known as Hampton Roads. Between the tip of the Virginia Peninsula near Old Point Comfort and the Willoughby Spit area of Norfolk in South Hampton Roads, a channel leads from Hampton Roads into the southern portion of the Chesapeake Bay and out to the Atlantic Ocean a few miles further east. Many boats pass through this river to import and export Virginia products.

Major Tributaries

 Appomattox River 
 Chickahominy River 
 Warwick River
 Pagan River 
 Nansemond River
 Looney Creek
 Cowpasture River
 Jackson River
 Craig Creek
 Catawba Creek
 Maury River

Recreation

The James River contains many parks and other recreational attractions. Canoeing, fishing, kayaking, hiking, and swimming are some of the activities that people enjoy along the river during the summer. From the river's start in the Blue Ridge mountains to Richmond, numerous rapids and pools offer fishing and whitewater rafting. The most intense whitewater stretch is a  segment that ends in downtown Richmond where the river goes over the fall line. This is the only place in the country where extensive class III (class IV with above average river levels) whitewater conditions exist within sight of skyscrapers. Below the fall line east of Richmond, the river is better suited for water skiing and other large boat recreation. In the Chesapeake watershed, the James River is the last confirmed holdout for the nearly extirpated Atlantic sturgeon. In May 2007 a survey identified 175 sturgeon remaining in the entire river, with 15 specimens exceeding .

Dams
Due to its potential for generating mechanical power for rotating machinery such as grist mills, hydroelectric power, and as a water route for trade, many dams have been built across the James River since the time of European settlement of the region. While most of these dams have been removed or failed, several dams still exist along the upper course of the river. From the head of the river downstream to Richmond are found the following dams as identified by the current US Army Corps of Engineers National Inventory of Dams:
The Cushaw Hydroelectric Project near Glasgow and Big Island.
The Bedford Hydropower Project near Big Island.
The Big Island Dam near Big Island.
The Coleman Falls Dam in Coleman Falls
The Holcomb Rock Dam near Lynchburg.
The Reusens Dam near Lynchburg.
The Scotts Mill Dam in Lynchburg.
The Bosher Dam in Richmond.

The tallest dam is the Reusens Dam, which also has the greatest hydroelectric nameplate capacity and the greatest reservoir capacity. At 1,617 feet, the longest dam is the Cushaw Hydroelectric Project due to the highly angled path the dam takes across the river.

While not identified in the National Inventory of Dams, a very low head weir structure is found below Bosher Dam in Richmond on either side of Williams Island. Known as the "Z-Dam" for its zigzag course on the south side of the island, the current structure was built in 1932 and serves to direct water into Richmond's water treatment facility on the north bank. The less than 5 feet tall dam does not serve any power or navigation purpose.

Bridges

Highway bridges below Richmond
Due to ocean-going shipping upriver as far as the Port of Richmond, a combination of ferryboats, high bridges and bridge-tunnels are used for highway traffic. Crossings east to west include:

The Hampton Roads Bridge-Tunnel (I-64)
The Monitor-Merrimac Memorial Bridge-Tunnel (I-664)
The James River Bridge (US 17/ US 258/ VA 32)
The Jamestown Ferry (VA 31) (toll-free)
The Benjamin Harrison Memorial Bridge near Hopewell. This is a drawbridge on VA 106 / VA 156 which replaced ferry service in 1966. It was the site of a major collision of a ship in 1977.
The Varina-Enon Bridge is a high cable-stayed bridge carrying I-295 which was the second of its type in the U.S. when it was completed.
The Vietnam Veterans Memorial Bridge carries the Pocahontas Parkway (State Route 895) via a high-level bridge to connect to State Route 150 at Interstate 95.

The SR 895 high-level crossing is the last bridge east of the Deepwater Port of Richmond and head of ocean-going navigation at the fall line of the James River. West of this point, potential flooding is more of an engineering concern than clearance for watercraft.

Highway bridges at Richmond
The following is a list of extant highway bridges across the James River with one or both ends within the City of Richmond.

 Interstate 95 James River Bridge (I-95)
 Mayo Bridge (US-360)
 Manchester Bridge (US-60)
 Robert E. Lee Memorial Bridge (US-1, US-301 and U.S. Bicycle Route 1)
 Boulevard Bridge (VA-161) (toll bridge, restricted weights)
 Powhite Parkway Bridge (Powhite Parkway and VA-76) (toll bridge)
 Huguenot Memorial Bridge (VA-147)
 Edward E. Willey Bridge (VA-150)

Highway bridges west of Richmond
The following is a partial, incomplete list of extant highway bridges across the James River west of Richmond.

 World War II Veterans Memorial Bridge (SR 288)
 U.S. Route 522 near Maidens
 State Route 45 near Cartersville
 Columbia Road (Route 690) near Columbia
 U.S. Route 15 near Bremo Bluff
 State Route 602 at Howardsville
 State Route 20 near Scottsville
 State Route 56 near Wingina
 U.S. Route 60 at Bent Creek
 Monacan Bridge (U.S. Route 29 east of Lynchburg)
 Carter Glass Memorial Bridge (U.S. Route 29 Business at Lynchburg)
 John Lynch Memorial Bridge (Lynchburg)
 Blue Ridge Parkway near Big Island
 U.S. Route 501 at Snowden
 State Route 759 at Natural Bridge Station
 State Route 614 at Arcadia
 U.S. Route 11, State Route 43 and U.S. Bicycle Route 76 at Buchanan
 Interstate 81 at Buchanan
 State Route 630 at Springwood
 James Street at Eagle Rock connecting U.S. Route 220 and State Route 43
 U.S. Route 220 near Eagle Rock
 Bridge Street at Glen Wilton
 U.S. Route 220 near Iron Gate

Bicycles
The Monitor-Merrimac Memorial Bridge-Tunnel prohibits bicycles, but bicyclists may take the Jamestown Ferry.  After a fatal accident on the Boulevard Bridge , the City of Richmond requires bicycles to travel on the sidewalk for the length of the bridge.

James River Reserve Fleet

The James River Reserve Fleet is the anchorage for a large portion of the National Defense Reserve Fleet, called the "James River fleet" or the "ghost fleet," consisting of "mothballed" ships, mostly merchant vessels, that can be activated within 20 to 120 days to provide shipping for the United States during national emergencies, either military or non-military, such as commercial shipping crises. The fleet is managed by the U.S. Department of Transportation's Maritime Administration.  It is a different entity from the United States Navy reserve fleets, which consist largely of warships.

See also
List of rivers of Virginia
James River bateau
James River Squadron
Army of the James
Atlantic Reserve Fleet, Norfolk

References

External links

Online exhibition of the James River & Kanawha Canal
Heritage of the James River, talk by Ann Woodlief at James River Symposium, 1995
James River Association
James River During the Civil War in Encyclopedia Virginia

James VI and I
 01
Rivers of Virginia
Tributaries of the Chesapeake Bay
Rivers of Richmond, Virginia
Rivers of James City County, Virginia